In astrophysics, the Emden–Chandrasekhar equation is a dimensionless form of the Poisson equation for the density distribution of a spherically symmetric isothermal gas sphere subjected to its own gravitational force, named after Robert Emden and Subrahmanyan Chandrasekhar. The equation was first introduced by Robert Emden in 1907. The equation has no known explicit solution. If a polytropic fluid is used instead of an isothermal fluid, one obtains the Lane–Emden equation. The isothermal assumption is usually modeled to describe the core of a star. The equation is solved with the initial conditions,

The equation appears in other branches of physics as well, for example the same equation appears in the Frank-Kamenetskii explosion theory for a spherical vessel. The relativistic version of this spherically symmetric isothermal model was studied by Subrahmanyan Chandrasekhar in 1972.

Derivation

For an isothermal gaseous star, the pressure  is due to the kinetic pressure and radiation pressure

whe

 is the density
 is the Boltzmann constant
 is the mean molecular weight
 is the mass of the proton
 is the temperature of the star
 is the Stefan–Boltzmann constant
 is the speed of light

The equation for equilibrium of the star requires a balance between the pressure force and gravitational force

The equation is re-written as

 

Introducing the transformation

where  is the central density of the star, leads to

The boundary conditions are

For , the solution goes like

Limitations of the model

Assuming isothermal sphere has some disadvantages. Though the density obtained as solution of this isothermal gas sphere decreases from the centre, it decreases too slowly to give a well-defined surface and finite mass for the sphere.

This behavior of density  gives rise to increase in mass with increase in radius. Thus, the model is usually valid to describe the core of the star, where the temperature is approximately constant.

Singular solution

Introducing the transformation  transforms the equation to

The equation has a singular solution given by

This equation can be reduced to first order by introducing

then we have

Reduction

There is another reduction due to Edward Arthur Milne. Let us define

then

Properties

If  is a solution to Emden–Chandrasekhar equation, then  is also a solution of the equation, where  is an arbitrary constant.
The solutions of the Emden–Chandrasekhar equation which are finite at the origin have necessarily  at

See also

Lane–Emden equation
Frank-Kamenetskii theory
Chandrasekhar's white dwarf equation

References

Equations of physics
Fluid dynamics
Stellar dynamics
Ordinary differential equations